Igor Primc (born 8 January 1966 in Novo Mesto) is a male discus thrower from Slovenia. His personal best throw is 64.79 metres, achieved in September 1999 in Novo Mesto.

He finished eleventh at the 2001 World Championships. At the Mediterranean Games he won the gold medal in 1997, the silver in 2005 and finished fifth in 2001.  In addition he competed at the World Championships in 1995, 1997 and 1999 as well as the Olympic Games in 1996 and 2004 without qualifying for the final round.

Achievements

References 
 

1966 births
Living people
Slovenian male discus throwers
Athletes (track and field) at the 1996 Summer Olympics
Athletes (track and field) at the 2004 Summer Olympics
Olympic athletes of Slovenia
Sportspeople from Novo Mesto
Mediterranean Games gold medalists for Slovenia
Mediterranean Games silver medalists for Slovenia
Mediterranean Games medalists in athletics
Athletes (track and field) at the 1997 Mediterranean Games
Athletes (track and field) at the 2001 Mediterranean Games
Athletes (track and field) at the 2005 Mediterranean Games